The Recorder of New York City was a municipal officer of New York City from 1683 until 1907. He was at times a judge of the Court of General Sessions, the Court of Special Sessions, and the New York Court of Common Pleas; Vice-President of the Board of Supervisors of New York County; Vice-President of the Board of Aldermen of New York City; Deputy Mayor of New York City; a director of the Bank of the Manhattan Company; a commissioner of the city's Sinking fund; a commissioner of the Metropolitan Police Board; and a member of the board of many charitable organizations. The Recorder was not a recorder of deeds, these were kept by the Register of New York City.

History
The first recorders were appointed by the colonial governor, and held the office "during the Governor's pleasure", meaning that there was no defined term of office.

Under the State Constitution of 1777, the recorder was appointed by the Council of Appointment, and held the office "during the Council's pleasure", there being still no defined term of office.

From 1787 to 1875, the recorder was also a member of the Board of Supervisors of the County of New York, which consisted of the mayor, the recorder and the aldermen of New York City. In the absence of the mayor, the recorder presided over the Board.

Under the State Constitution of 1821, the recorder was appointed by the Governor of New York, and confirmed by the New York State Senate, and held the office until the appointment of a successor.

On December 15, 1847, the City Charter was amended, providing for the election of the recorder by popular ballot at the same time of the general elections (the Tuesday after the first Monday in November), to take office on January 1 next for a term of three years.

In 1857, when the New York Metropolitan Police was created, the recorder became one of the commissioners of the Police Board.

The recorder's term was extended to six years during John K. Hackett's first term. After the adoption of the "Judicial Article" in 1869, the Recorder was not considered a municipal officer any more, but a judicial officer. He ceased to be a member of the Board of Supervisors, and his term was extended to 14 years, to match the term length of the other judges and justices of the New York courts.

The recorder remained one of the judges of the Court of General Sessions (the New York City court of general jurisdiction in criminal cases) until the office was abolished in 1907.

List of Recorders

References

Sources
The New York Civil List compiled by Franklin Benjamin Hough (page 428; Weed, Parsons and Co., 1858)
Courts and Lawyers of New York: A History, 1609-1925 by Alden Chester & E. Melvin Williams (Vol. II, page 896)
Historical Ssketch of the Board of Supervisors of the County of New York (pages 11ff)
THE RECORDERSHIP in NYT on January 12, 1866

Government of New York City
Legal history of New York (state)
New York City